Dexing railway station is a railway station in Dexing, Shangrao, Jiangxi, China. It is an intermediate stop on the Hefei–Fuzhou high-speed railway. It opened with the line on 28 June 2015.

References 

Railway stations in Jiangxi
Railway stations in China opened in 2015